East London is a city on the southeast coast of South Africa in the Buffalo City Metropolitan Municipality of the Eastern Cape province. The city lies on the Indian Ocean coast, largely between the Buffalo River and the Nahoon River, and hosts the country's only river port. , East London had a population of over 267,000 with over 755,000 in the metropolitan area.

History

Early history
John Bailie, one of the 1820 Settlers, surveyed the Buffalo River mouth and founded the town in 1836. There is a memorial on Signal Hill commemorating the event.
The city formed around the only river port in South Africa and was originally known as Port Rex. Later it was renamed London in honour of the capital city of the United Kingdom, hence the name East London. This settlement on the West Bank was the nucleus of the town of East London, which was elevated to city status in 1914.

A British fort, Fort Glamorgan, was built on the West Bank in 1847, and annexed to the Cape Colony that same year. This fort is one of a series of British-built forts, including Fort Murray, Fort White, Fort Cox, Fort Hare, Fort Jackson and Fort Beaufort, in the border area that became known as British Kaffraria.

With later development of the port came the settlement of permanent residents, including German settlers, most of whom were bachelors. These settlers were responsible for German names of some towns in the vicinity of East London such as Stutterheim and Berlin. Today, German surnames such as Gehring, Salzwedel and Peinke are still common in East London, but the descendants of the settlers rapidly became Anglicised.

The existing port, in the mouth of the Buffalo River, adjoining the Indian Ocean, began operating in 1870. In 1872, the Cape Colony, under the leadership of its first Prime Minister John Molteno, attained a degree of independence from Britain. The new government merged the three neighbouring settlements of East London, East London East and Panmure in 1873, forming the core of the current municipality, and in 1876 it began construction on the region's railway lines, commencing on the river's east bank. At the same time, it began construction of the East London harbour. This new infrastructure rapidly accelerated development of the area into today's thriving city of East London.

The unusual double-decker bridge over the Buffalo River was completed in 1935, and to this day is the only bridge of its type in South Africa. Modern day attractions include the Gately House, City Hall, Cape Railways, Nahoon Museum, East London Museum housing the coelacanth, a prehistoric fish, thought to be extinct, discovered live at the Chalumna River mouth near East London by fishermen in 1938, and numerous memorial statues.

Apartheid era 

In 1948, the National Party came to power in South Africa, and began to implement the policy of apartheid. Apartheid as a doctrine envisaged the total segregation of races in South Africa, and East London was no different. In 1950, the Group Areas Act was placed upon the statute books making absolute segregation in all urban areas mandatory. In 1951, the Land Tenure Advisory Board, the body created to enforce the act, conducted initial investigations into the reallocation of space along racial lines in East London. Residential segregation had long been practised in East London prior to the advent of apartheid. In 1941, the East London Municipality moved residents from East Bank townships to the newly built township of Duncan Village.

In 1951, all inter-racial property exchanges were prohibited in East London. In 1955, the Amalinda area was zoned as a White Group Area by Government Gazette Proclamation number 21. This meant that the municipality's plans to extend the area in order to accommodate the Black African population were abandoned. In 1953, residents in the East Bank were forcibly moved to the new township of Mdantsane. In February 1966, the South African government defined Mdantsane as a separate homeland township. In 1956, Prime Minister Henrik Verwoerd, who was the architect of apartheid, forbade the East London municipality from extending the existing Duncan Village township and sanctioned the building of Mdantsane.

In 1961, these plans provided for the allocation of a distinct wedge of the city for Asian and Coloured residence, which "incorporated the areas of North End and the recently proclaimed Buffalo Flats location. This plan occasioned tremendous resentment in the city prompting petitions and letters of complaint from numerous organisations including the Black Sash, trade unions and various Black community groups. In 1967, the East London Municipality proclaimed the majority of the city an area for White occupancy, with the exception of a broad sector of land encompassing the Parkside, Parkridge and Buffalo Flats areas which was zoned for Coloured residence. Certain parts of Duncan Village were abolished and its African residents removed, new coloured and Asian locations were built and proclaimed upon land in 1973. In the same year, the newly constructed location of Braelynn was proclaimed an Indian area while Buffalo Flats Extension and Pefferville were proclaimed as Coloured areas. The construction/ extension of Coloured areas and the Duncan Village were suspended in 1983.

Post-apartheid
At the end of apartheid in 1994, East London became part of the province of Eastern Cape. In 2000, East London became part of Buffalo City Metropolitan Municipality, also consisting of Qonce, Bhisho and Mdantsane and is the seat of the Metro.

Geography and climate 

East London has an oceanic climate (Köppen Cfb), bordering on a humid subtropical climate (Köppen Cfa), with the warm temperatures and moderation typical of the South African coastline. Although it has no true dry season, there is a drying trend in the winter, with the wettest times of year being spring and autumn. There is also a shorter and lesser dry period in December and January.

The hottest temperatures have been recorded in springtime and autumn, rather than the summer months,due to violent berg (foehn) winds. Temperatures above  have only been recorded early in the season, from August to December. Berg winds contribute to these high temperatures, as already warm air from the arid interior is further heated through compression as it drops over the escarpment to sea level. Although temperatures have never dropped below freezing since records began, East London has recorded snowfall in 1985 and 1989.

Economy 

 
East London is the second largest industrial centre in the province. The motor industry is the dominant employer. A major Daimler plant is located next to the harbour, manufacturing Mercedes-Benz and other vehicles for the local market, as well as exporting to the United States and Brazil. Other industries include clothing, textiles, pharmaceuticals and food processing.

The period of international sanctions that followed in the 1980s damaged the economy of East London's harbour. Enormous investment in recent years, by corporations such as Daimler AG, has resulted in the harbour being developed to include a new car terminal.

From the 1960s until the 1990s, the apartheid government created tax and wage incentives to attract industries to the then black "independent states", including nearby Ciskei. Investment thus flowed into surrounding areas such as Fort Jackson and Dimbaza, leaving East London in relative isolation. Transport infrastructure deteriorated and port activity wound down.

To encourage investment in East London, the East London Industrial Development Zone (IDZ) was established on the West Bank in 2004, close to both the port and airport. 1500ha of land has been made available, and the site is one of four duty-free development areas in South Africa.

Suburbs 
 
Quigney
Southernwood
Belgravia
Amalinda
Winchester 
Chiselhurst
Beacon Bay
Berea
Arcadia
North End
Beaconhurst
Nahoon
Stirling
Woodleigh
Bunkers Hill
Bonnie Doon
Vincent
Baysville
Selborne
Cambridge
Morningside
Saxilby
Braelyn
Duncan Village
Parkridge
Parkside
Buffalo Flats
Bebelele
Gately
West Bank Village
Brookville
Sunnyridge
Rosemount
Fullers Bay
Siyakha
Collondale
Willow Park
Gompo
Haven Hills
Highway Gardens
Scenery Park
Wilsonia
Dorchester Heights
Quenera
Gonubie
Mdantsane
Potsdam
Fort Jackson

Sports 

Cricket is very popular around East London. A combined Border/Eastern Province cricket side known as the Warriors take part in the top provincial competition. Former Proteas wicketkeeper Mark Boucher who currently holds the Test record for most dismissals by a wicketkeeper hails from East London. Buffalo Park Stadium in East London hosted a match during the ICC Cricket World Cup in 2003 and two matches of the 2009 Indian Premier League.

The Buffalo Road Running Club of East London has created two established events that have gained international recognition. They are the Old Mutual Buffalo 42,2 km marathon, which is held in February/March each year, and South Africa's oldest 160 km extreme ultra marathon, the Washie, over a picturesque and undulating coastal route from Port Alfred to the city.

Triathlon is a popular sport and in particular the world-famous Ironman 70.3 South African event that takes place annually in January. Ironman 70.3 consists of a 1.9 km swim, 90 km of cycling and a 21.1 km road run. The event starts and finishes at Orient Beach in East London.

Rugby is popular in East London. The provincial team, the Border Bulldogs, currently plays in the First Division of the Currie Cup competition. Most national games in East London are played at the Buffalo City Stadium, which holds around 15000 people and was a host stadium during the 1995 Rugby World Cup. East London schools have produced many fine rugby players, including (in recent times) André Vos, Keith and Mark Andrews, Christiaan Scholtz, Brent Russell, Rory Kockott, Akona Ndungane and Odwa Ndungane.

Football is also very popular in the city. East London was home to the Blackburn Rovers, prior to its sudden dissolution in 2014.

Motocross is also popular and many national events are held in the area surrounding East London, due to the challenging terrain there and in Transkei. East London is home to the ELMCC (East London Motor Cycle Club), which organises most of the motorcycle events in the area.

East London is home to the Prince George Race Circuit, opened in 1959 (renamed East London Grand Prix Circuit), a historic motor racing track that hosted three Formula One South African Grand Prix during the 1930s and 1960s. The circuit is run and managed by Border Motor Sport Club on a shoestring budget. South Africa's only Formula One World Drivers' Champion, Jody Scheckter, started his motor racing career with a Renault Gordini on this track.

Golf is another favoured pastime in and around East London. East London Golf Club is a highly regarded championship golf course and is currently ranked No 12 in Golf Digest's Top 100 courses. Some of the other golf clubs in the region are the West Bank Golf Club, Gonubie Golf Club, Olivewood Golf Estate and Fish River Sun Country Club (a Gary Player-designed golf course). East London has also hosted the Africa Open tournament multiple times. Golfers can also hone their skills at the East London Golf Club Driving Range.

Martial arts are also very popular, with numerous clubs available for training in aikido, judo, karate, t'ai chi and many other forms of martial arts. The East London Aikido Club is taught by a 3rd dan local instructor who has trained under a number of international instructors in South Africa and overseas. Club members of the East London Aikido Club regularly represent their club at national aikido events. Fort Hare Karate and East London Goju Kai have also hosted many memorable events and training weekends.

Rowing is on the Buffalo River. The annual Buffalo Regatta began in 1881 and has become the largest in South Africa: in 2018 there were 1000 competitors participating in 200 events over three days.

Surfski is ideally suited to East London. The Port Elizabeth to East London Challenge organized by East London's Border Canoe club is the world's longest surfski race at 244 km long, often in extremely challenging conditions, takes place every second year, attracting competitors from around the world. It began in 1972 to see who was faster, ultra-distance runner John Ball over land, or surf lifesaver John Woods over water. John Ball won.

Education

Secondary education
Clarendon High School for Girls
Hudson Park High School
Port Rex Technical High School
Selborne College
Stirling High School
West Bank High School

Tertiary education
University of Fort Hare
Walter Sisulu University
University of South Africa

There are also a few private colleges.

Points of interest 

Other points of interest include:
East London Museum
Inkwenkwezi Private Game Reserve
Amathole Museum
Hood Point Lighthouse
East London Coast Nature Reserve

Transport 
East London is serviced by two national roads: the coastal N2 highway connects it to Qonce, Makhanda, Gqeberha and Cape Town to the west and Mthatha and Durban to the east. It is the southern end of the N6, which runs north via Komani and Aliwal North to Bloemfontein. Older sections of the N2 have been renumbered the R102. The R72 is an alternative route to Port Elizabeth, via Port Alfred. The R346 is an alternative route to King William's Town. East London, like South Africa's other major cities, uses Metropolitan (or M) routes as a third tier for its major intra-city roads.

East London railway station offers long-distance passenger services to Cape Town and Johannesburg via Springfontein, and local services.

King Phalo Airport is a commercial airport with service to other large South African metropolitan areas.

Notable people 
Anthony Clifford Allison - Geneticist and medical scientist
Mark Andrews – Rugby player
Masali Baduza – Actress
Wendy Botha – Four-time world surfing champion
Mark Boucher – International cricketer
Vuyani Bungu – Boxer
Jean-Michel Byron – Singer who sang with American rock band Toto in the 1980s
Norman Catherine – Artist
Marjorie Courtenay-Latimer – Museum curator who discovered a living coelacanth, a fish that was previously thought to have been extinct for millions of years
Colin Cowie - Hollywood events planner
Hlomla Dandala – A notable South African actor and television personality
The Dealians – Successful 1970s pop group
Ryan de Villiers – Actor
Ernie Els- International golfer
Allan Gray – South African investor and philanthropist 
Joan Harrison – Swimmer and 1952 Olympic champion
Rory Kockott – Rugby player
Jacob Maliekal – National badminton player who represented South Africa at the Rio Olympic Games in 2016
Makazole Mapimpi -South African Rugby world cup winner 2019
Lana Marks – South African-American fashion designer and former United States Ambassador to South Africa
Msaki – South African singer-songwriter and composer
Welcome Ncita – Boxer
Tats Nkonzo – South African comedian
Makhaya Ntini – Test cricketer with over 100 caps for the South African national team
Steve Palframan – Cricketer
Soso Rungqu – South African Actress 
Ian Scheckter – Racing driver
Jody Scheckter – Formula 1 racing champion in 1979
Jonty Skinner – Swimmer and US swimming coach
John Gordon Sprigg – Prime Minister of the Cape Colony
Wayne Taylor – Racing driver
André Vos – Rugby player
Wouter Wessels – Senior FF+ politician
Donald Woods – Author and anti-apartheid activist/born in Transkei
Zahara – South African musician

Coat of arms
The East London municipality assumed a coat of arms on 29 August 1892. The arms were : Argent, a cross Gules between in the first and fourth quarters a garb and in the second and third quarters a fleece Or; on a chief Azure a demi-sun Or. A golden anchor was placed behind the shield, no doubt to show that the town was a seaport. The motto was Animo et fide.

The arms were improved in the 1950s by the town clerk, H.H. Driffield. He changed the shield from silver to ermine, removed the anchor and devised a crest consisting of two crossed anchors and a mural crown. Heraldist Ivan Mitford-Barberton added two buffalo as supporters. The improved design was granted by the College of Arms on 15 December 1959. It was registered with the Cape Provincial Administration in 1960, and at the Bureau of Heraldry in 1967.

References

External links 

Official website of Buffalo City

East London

 
Populated places in Buffalo City Metropolitan Municipality
Populated coastal places in South Africa
Port cities in South Africa
Second Boer War concentration camps
Port cities and towns of the Indian Ocean
Populated places established in 1836
1872 establishments in the Cape Colony
1872 establishments in South Africa